The Savannakhet stadium, also known as Savannakhet Provincial stadium, is a multi-purpose stadium in Savannakhet, Laos. It is used mostly for football matches. The stadium is built in 2005 and holds 15,000 people. Since 2006, some matches of the Lao League have been played there. The stadium is also the home of Savannakhet FC, who will play in the Lao League in one of the following seasons.

References

External links 

 Fussballtempel: Stadiums in Laos
 World Stadiums: Stadiums in Laos

Football venues in Laos
Buildings and structures in Savannakhet province
Sports venues completed in 2006
Savannakhet